The kallikantzaros , (or kallikantzaroi in plural) is a malevolent goblin in Southeast European and Anatolian folklore. Stories about the kallikantzaros or its equivalents can typically be found in Greece, Bulgaria, Turkey, Serbia, Albania, Bosnia, and Cyprus. Kallikantzaroi are believed to dwell underground but come to the surface during the twelve days of Christmas, from 25 December to 6 January (from the winter solstice for a fortnight, during which time the sun ceases its seasonal movement).

Etymology
The term kallikantzaros is speculated to be derived from the Greek kalos-kentauros ("beautiful centaur"), although this theory has been met with many objections. A second theory proposes that the word comes from Turkish kara-kondjolos "werewolf, vampire", from kara "black" and koncolos "bloodsucker, werewolf".

Greek folklore
It is believed that kallikantzaroi stay underground, sawing the trunk of the world tree so that it will collapse, along with the Earth. However, according to folklore, when the final part of the trunk is about to be sawed, Christmas dawns and kallikantzaroi  are able to come to the surface. They forget the tree and come to bring trouble to mortals.

Finally, on the Epiphany (6 January), the sun starts moving again, and they must return underground to continue their sawing. They see that during their absence the world tree has healed itself, so they must start working all over again. This is believed to occur annually.

Appearance

There is no standard description of the appearance of kallikantzaroi; there are regional variations as to how their appearance is described. Some Greek illustrators have imagined them with some animal parts, such as hairy bodies, horse legs, or boar tusks. Sometimes they are enormous, at other times diminutive. Other groups see them as small humans with a horrible odor. They are predominantly male, often with protruding sexual characteristics.  Many Greeks have imagined them as tall, black and hairy, with burning red eyes, goats' or donkeys' ears, monkeys' arms, tongues that hang out and heads that are huge. Nonetheless, the most common belief is that they are small, black creatures, humanoid apart from their long black tails, and said to resemble little black devils. They are also mostly blind, speak with a lisp and love to eat frogs, worms, and other small creatures.

Lore
Kallikantzaroi are believed to be creatures of the night. According to folklore, there were many ways people could protect themselves during the days when the kallikantzaroi were loose. One such method was to leave a colander on their doorstep to trick the visiting kallikantzaros. It was believed that since it could not count above two – three was believed to be a holy number, and by pronouncing it, the kallikantzaros would supposedly kill itself – the kallikantzaros would sit at the doorstep all night, counting each hole of the colander, until the sun rose and it was forced to hide.
	
It is an annual tradition in some cultures to throw “loukoumades” (a donut-like dessert filled with syrup) and sausages on your roof, and sing a specific song. It is believed that once this is done, the kallikantzaroi will eat these and leave, returning to their work underground.

Another supposed method of protection from kallikantzaroi was to leave the fire burning in the fireplace, all night, so that they could not enter through it. In some areas, people would burn the Yule log for the duration of the twelve days. In other areas, people would throw foul-smelling shoes into the fire, as the stench was believed to repel the kallikantzaroi, forcing them to stay away. Additional ways to keep them away included marking one's door with a black cross on Christmas Eve and burning incense.

According to legend, any child born during the twelve days of Christmas was in danger of transforming into a kallikantzaros during each Christmas season, starting with adulthood. It was believed that the antidote to prevent this transformation was to bind the baby in tresses of garlic or straw, or to singe the child's toenails. According to another legend, anyone born on a Saturday could see and talk with the kallikantzaroi.

One particularity that set the kallikantzaroi apart from other goblins or creatures in folklore was that they were said to appear on Earth for only twelve days each year. Their short duration on Earth, as well as the fact that they were not considered purely malevolent creatures but rather impish and stupid, led to a number of theories about their creation. One such theory connects them to the masquerades of the ancient Roman winter festival of Bacchanalia, and earlier the Greek Dionysia.  During the drunken, orgiastic parts of the festivals, people wearing masks, hidden under costumes in bestial shapes yet still appearing humanoid, may have made an exceptional impression on the minds of simple folk who were intoxicated.

In Greek, the term kallikantzaros is also used to describe a number of other short, ugly and usually mischievous beings in folklore. When not used for the aforementioned creatures, it seems to express the collective sense for the Irish word leprechaun and the English words gnome and goblin.

Serbian folklore
In Serbian Christmas traditions, the Twelve Days of Christmas were previously called the "unbaptized days" and were considered a time when demonic forces of all kinds were believed to be more active and dangerous than usual. People were cautious not to attract their attention, and did not go out late at night. The latter precaution was especially because of the mythical demons called karakondžula (also karakondža / караконџа, karakandža / караканџа or karapandža / карапанџа), imagined as heavy, squat, and ugly creatures. According to tradition, when a karakondžula found someone outdoors during the night of an unbaptized day, it would jump on the person's back and demand to be carried wherever it wanted. This torture would end only when roosters announced the dawn; at that moment the creature would release its victim and run away.

The karakondžula is also known to punish and torment people who commit adultery. Adulterers were known to sneak out of their homes while their significant other would sleep, and then visit the person they were cheating with, or prostitutes, or brothels. The karakondžula would sit and wait on the top of the doorframe of the front door to the house and jump on the back of the adulterers and lash them with a stick or scratch or dig its sharp nails in the person back and neck and force them to run through nearby forests all night. Similarity to other accounts the karakondžula would flee by the sight of first dawn.

This can be seen as a warning to would be adulterers to think carefully about their intentions, desires and understand the consequences that they would incur if they were to fulfill such actions. In this version of the myth the karakondžula would come back every night and remain on the door lintel until the adulterers confess their sins to their significant other

Anatolian Turkish folklore
The karakoncolos is a malevolent creature in Northeast Anatolian Turkish-Islamic folklore. It is a variety of bogeyman, usually merely troublesome and rather harmless, but sometimes truly evil. It is believed to have thick hairy fur like the Sasquatch. According to late Ottoman Turkish myth, they appear on the first ten days of Zemheri ("the dreadful cold") when they stand on murky corners, and ask seemingly ordinary questions to passers-by. The legend states that in order to escape harm, one should answer each question, using the word kara (Turkish for "black"), or risk being struck dead by the creature. It was also said in Turkish folklore that the karakoncolos could call people out during the cold Zemheri nights by imitating voices of loved ones. The victim of the karakoncolos risked freezing to death if he or she could not awake from the charm.

Bulgarian folklore
The Bulgarian name of the demon is karakondjul (also romanized karakondjol, karakondzul/karakondžul) or karakondjo. They may be conceived of variously: as being human-like except for having a hairy body, a tail, and a large head with horns on it, or a one-eyed being standing on a single leg, or a horse-headed man. It is considered a shape-shifter which may appear as a dog, a man, a sheep, or a calf. It is reputed to dwell in caves, or rivers, or abandoned water mill, and come out at night.

A Bulgarian custom called kukeri (or koukeri) is performed to scare away the evil creature and avoid contact with it.

Albanian folklore 
In Albanian folklore Kukuth (kukudhi) and Karkanxholji (Karkançoli, related to Greek καλλικάντσαρος) are undead corpses, who go around in January, laden with chains and effusing a deadly breath. Known also among Calabrian Albanians. According to another version, the Karkançual is vested with iron clothes, which is why chainmail armor is known as këmish karkançoli in Albanian.

In popular culture
A reference to the "kallikanzari of modern Greece" is made in H. P. Lovecraft's novella The Whisperer in Darkness (1931).

The narrator/protagonist of Roger Zelazny's novel This Immortal is a Greek born on Christmas Day. The book's first sentence is his new wife teasingly calling him a "kallikanzaros" [sic], although she doesn't mean anything hostile by it. The reference comes up several other times throughout the story.

Kallikantzaroi are the subject of the Grimm episode "The Grimm Who Stole Christmas".

Other uses
Because of the connection with Christmas, Kallikantzaroi are syncretised with the more benevolent Christmas elves in modern Greek culture, and Santa Claus's helpers are sometimes referred to as Kallikantzaroi.

The word Kallikantzaros has been applied to other representations of goblins or trolls when translated into Greek. For example, the Gringotts goblins from Harry Potter are referred to as Kallikantzaros in Greek translations.

See also
Kallo and the Goblins
Krampus

References
Citations

Bibliography

Sources
Özhan Öztürk. (Black Sea: Encyclopedic Dictionary) Karadeniz Ansiklopedik Sözlük.  2 Vol. Heyamola Publishing. Istanbul. 2005

External links

Karakoncolos, Karakura, Kukeri (Turkish)
The Scariest Creatures in Anatolian Folklore "Karakoncolos: A Winter Creature"

Greek fairy tales
Greek legendary creatures
Greek culture
Greek folklore
Greek words and phrases
Turkish folklore
Bulgarian folklore
Serbian mythology
Slavic legendary creatures
Goblins
Shapeshifters
Trees in mythology
Christmas characters
 
Supernatural legends